Georgi Angelov (born 12 November 1990 in Sofia) is a Bulgarian footballer who plays as a centre-back and defensive midfielder for Etar Veliko Tarnovo.

Career

Youth career
Georgi Angelov start his football steps from Levski Academy and promoted to Levski reserve squad. He made his debut for the first squad on 25 November 2009 in a match against Litex Lovech. Angelov came from the bench as a substitute for Zé Soares in the 74th minute.

Bansko
In June 2011 Angelov joined Bansko.

Levski Sofia
On 12 June 2017, Angelov signed a 3-year contract with Levski Sofia.  On 28 February 2018, he was loaned to Vitosha Bistritsa for the rest of the season.  In June, his contract was terminated by mutual consent.

Beroe
On 21 June 2018, Angelov signed with Beroe as free agent.

Etar
In July 2022 he joined Etar Veliko Tarnovo.

International career
Angelov received his first call up for the Bulgaria national side on 12 November for the UEFA Nations League matches against Finland on 15 November 2020 and Republic of Ireland on 18 November, making his debut in the 0:0 away draw against the latter.

References

External links
 Player Profile
 Profile at Levskisofia.info
 
 

1990 births
Living people
Footballers from Sofia
Bulgarian footballers
Bulgaria international footballers
Association football midfielders
Association football central defenders
PFC Levski Sofia players
FC Bansko players
FC Montana players
FC Vereya players
FC Vitosha Bistritsa players
PFC Beroe Stara Zagora players
First Professional Football League (Bulgaria) players
Second Professional Football League (Bulgaria) players